The Afrotropical realm is one of Earth's eight biogeographic realms. It includes Africa south of the Sahara Desert, the southern Arabian Peninsula, the island of Madagascar, and the islands of the western Indian Ocean. It was formerly known as the Ethiopian Zone or Ethiopian Region. The area is currently experiencing the negative effects of rapid human population growth.

Major ecological regions 
Most of the Afrotropical realm, with the exception of Africa's southern tip, has a tropical climate. A broad belt of deserts, including the Atlantic and Sahara deserts of northern Africa and the Arabian Desert of the Arabian Peninsula, separate the Afrotropic from the Palearctic realm, which includes northern Africa and temperate Eurasia.

Sahel and Sudan 
South of the Sahara, two belts of tropical grassland and savanna run east and west across the continent, from the Atlantic Ocean to the Ethiopian Highlands. Immediately south of the Sahara lies the Sahel belt, a transitional zone of semi-arid short grassland and vachellia savanna. Rainfall increases further south in the Sudanian Savanna, also known simply as the Sudan, a belt of taller grasslands and savannas. The Sudanian Savanna is home to two great flooded grasslands, the Sudd wetland in South Sudan, and the Niger Inland Delta in Mali. The forest-savanna mosaic is a transitional zone between the grasslands and the belt of tropical moist broadleaf forests near the equator.

Southern Arabian woodlands 
South Arabia, which includes Yemen and parts of western Oman and southwestern Saudi Arabia, has few permanent forests. Some of the notable ones are Jabal Bura, Jabal Raymah, and Jabal Badaj in the Yemeni highland escarpment and the seasonal forests in eastern Yemen and the Dhofar region of Oman. Other woodlands scatter the land and are very small and are predominantly Juniperus or Vachellia forests.

Forest zone 

The forest zone, a belt of lowland tropical moist broadleaf forests, runs across most of equatorial Africa's intertropical convergence zone. The Upper Guinean forests of West Africa extend along the coast from Guinea to Togo. The Dahomey Gap, a zone of forest-savanna mosaic that reaches to the coast, separates the Upper Guinean forests from the Lower Guinean forests, which extend along the Gulf of Guinea from eastern Benin through Cameroon and Gabon to the western Democratic Republic of the Congo. The largest tropical forest zone in Africa is the Congolian forests of the Congo Basin in Central Africa.

A belt of tropical moist broadleaf forest also runs along the Indian Ocean coast, from southern Somalia to South Africa.

East African grasslands and savannas 
 Serengeti

Eastern Africa's highlands 

Afromontane region, from the Ethiopian Highlands to the Drakensberg Mountains of South Africa, including the East African Rift. Distinctive flora, including Podocarpus and Afrocarpus, as well as giant Lobelias and Senecios.
 Ethiopian Highlands
 Albertine rift montane forests
 East African montane forests and Eastern Arc forests

Zambezian region 

The Zambezian region includes woodlands, savannas, grasslands, and thickets. Characteristic plant communities include Miombo woodlands, drier mopane and Baikiaea woodlands, and higher-elevation Bushveld. It extends from east to west in a broad belt across the continent, south of the rainforests of the Guineo-Congolian region, and north of the deserts of southeastern Africa, the countries are Malawi, Angola, Botswana, Mozambique, Zambia and Zimbabwe, and the subtropical.

Deserts of southern Africa 

 Namib Desert
 Kalahari Desert
 Karoo
 Tankwa Karoo
 Richtersveld

Cape floristic region 
The Cape floristic region, at Africa's southern tip, is a Mediterranean climate region that is home to a significant number of endemic taxa, as well as to plant families like the proteas (Proteaceae) that are also found in the Australasian realm.

Madagascar and the Indian Ocean islands 

Madagascar and neighboring islands form a distinctive sub-region of the realm, with numerous endemic taxa like the lemurs. Madagascar and the Granitic Seychelles are old pieces of the ancient supercontinent of Gondwana, and broke away from Africa millions of years ago. Other Indian Ocean islands, like the Comoros and Mascarene Islands, are volcanic islands that formed more recently. Madagascar contains a variety of plant habitats, from rainforests to mountains and deserts, as its biodiversity and ratio of endemism is extremely high.

Endemic plants and animals

Plants 
The Afrotropical realm is home to a number of endemic plant families. Madagascar and the Indian Ocean Islands are home to ten endemic families of flowering plants; eight are endemic to Madagascar (Asteropeiaceae, Didymelaceae, Didiereaceae, Kaliphoraceae, Melanophyllaceae, Physenaceae, Sarcolaenaceae, and Sphaerosepalaceae), one to Seychelles (Mesdusagynaceae), and one to the Mascarene Islands (Psiloxylaceae). Twelve plant families are endemic or nearly endemic to South Africa (including Curtisiaceae, Heteropyxidaceae, Penaeaceae, Psiloxylaceae, and Rhynchocalycaceae) of which five are endemic to the Cape floristic province (including Grubbiaceae). Other endemic Afrotropic families include Barbeyaceae, Dirachmaceae, Montiniaceae, Myrothamnaceae, and Oliniaceae.

Animals 

The East African Great Lakes (Victoria, Malawi, and Tanganyika) are the center of biodiversity of many freshwater fishes, especially cichlids (they harbor more than two-thirds of the estimated 2,000 species in the family). The West African coastal rivers region covers only a fraction of West Africa, but harbours 322 of West Africa's fish species, with 247 restricted to this area and 129 restricted even
to smaller ranges. The central rivers fauna comprises 194 fish species, with 119 endemics and only 33 restricted to small areas.

The Afrotropic has various endemic bird families, including ostriches (Struthionidae), sunbirds, the secretary bird (Sagittariidae), guineafowl (Numididae), and mousebirds (Coliidae). Also, several families of passerines are limited to the Afrotropics; These include rock-jumpers (Chaetopidae) and rockfowl (Picathartidae).

Africa has three endemic orders of mammals, the Tubulidentata (aardvarks), Afrosoricida (tenrecs and golden moles), and Macroscelidea (elephant shrews). The East-African plains are well known for their diversity of large mammals.

Four species of great apes (Hominidae) are endemic to Central Africa: both species of gorilla (western gorilla, Gorilla gorilla, and eastern gorilla, Gorilla beringei) and both species of chimpanzee (common chimpanzee, Pan troglodytes, and bonobo, Pan paniscus). Humans and their ancestors originated in Africa.

Afrotropical terrestrial ecoregions

Habitats 
The tropical environment is rich in terms of biodiversity. Tropical African forest is 18 percent of the world total and covers over 3.6 million square kilometers of land in West, East and Central Africa. This total area can be subdivided to 2.69 million square kilometers (74%) in Central Africa, 680,000 square kilometers (19%) in West Africa, and 250,000 square kilometers (7%) in East Africa. In West Africa, a chain of rain forests up to 350 km long extends from the eastern border of Sierra Leone all the way to Ghana. In Ghana the forest zone gradually dispels near the Volta river, following a 300 km stretch of Dahomey savanna gap. The rain forest of West Africa continues from east of Benin through southern Nigeria and officially ends at the border of Cameroon along the Sanaga river.

Semi-deciduous rainforests in West Africa began at the fringed coastline of Guinea Bissau (via Guinea) and run all the way through the coasts of Sierra Leone, Liberia, Ivory Coast, Ghana, continuing through Togo, Benin, Nigeria and Cameroon, and ending at the Congo Basin. Rain forests such as these are the richest, oldest, most prolific, and most complex systems on earth, are dying, and in turn are upsetting the delicate ecological balance. This may disturb global hydrological cycles, release vast amounts of greenhouse gases into the atmosphere, and lessen the planet's ability to store excess carbon.

The rain forest vegetation of the Guinea-Congolian transition area, extending from Senegal to western Uganda are constituted of two main types: The semi-deciduous rain forest characterized by a large number of trees whose leaves are left during dry season. It appears in areas where the dry period (rainfall below about 100 mm) reach three months. Then, the evergreen or the semi-evergreen rain forest, climatically adapted to somewhat more humid conditions than the semi-deciduous type and is usually there in areas where the dry period is shorter than two months. This forest is usually richer in legumes and variety of species and its maximum development is around the Bight of Biafra, from Eastern Nigeria to Gabon, and with some large patches leaning to the west from Ghana to Liberia and to the east of Zaïre-Congo basin.

Judging against rain forest areas in other continents, most of the African rainforest is rather dry and receives between 1600 and 2000 mm of rainfall per year. Areas receiving more rain than this mainly are in coastal areas. The circulation of rainfall throughout the year remains less than other rain forest regions in the world. The average monthly rainfall in nearly the whole region remains under 100 mm throughout the year. The variety of the African rain forest flora is also less than the other rain forests. This lack of flora has been credited to several reasons such as the gradual infertility since the Miocene, severe dry periods during Quaternary, or the refuge theory of the cool and dry climate of tropical Africa during the last severe ice age of about 18000 years ago.

Fauna 

The Tropical African rainforest has rich fauna, commonly smaller mammal species rarely seen by humans. New species continually are being found. For instance, in late 1988 an unknown shrub species was discovered on the shores of the Median River in Western Cameroon. Since then many species have become extinct. However, undisturbed rainforests are some of the richest habitats of animal species. Today, undisturbed rainforests are remnant, but rare. Timber extraction not only changes the edifice of the forest, it affects the tree species spectrum by removing economically important species and terminates other species in the process. The species that compose African rainforests are of different evolutionary ages because of the contraction and expansion of the rainforest in response to global climatic fluctuations.
The pygmy hippopotamus, the giant forest hog, the water chevrotain,  insectivores, rodents, bats, tree frogs, and bird species inhabit  the forest. These species, along with a diversity of fruits and insects, make a special habitat that allow for a diversity of life. The top canopy is home to monkey species like the red colobus, Black-and-white Colobus, and many other Old-World monkey species. Unfortunately, many of these rare and unique species are endangered or critically endangered and need protection from poachers and provided ample habitat to thrive.

Flora 
In Tropical Africa, about 8,500 plant species have been documented, including 403 orchid species.

Species unfamiliar to the changes in forest structure for industrial use might not survive. If timber use continues and an increasing amount of farming occurs, it could lead to the mass killing of animal species. The home of nearly half of the world's animals and plant species are tropical rainforests. The rain forests provide possible economic resource for over-populated developing countries. Despite the stated need to save the West African forests, there are divergence in how to work. In April 1992, countries with some of the largest surviving tropical rain forests banned a rainforest protection plan proposed by the British government. It aimed at finding endangered species of tropical trees in order to control trade in them. Experts estimate that the rainforest of West Africa, at the present trend of deforestation, may disappear by the year 2020.

Africa's rainforest, like many others emergent in the world, has a special significance to the indigenous peoples of Africa who have occupied them for millennia.

Region protection 
Many African countries are in economic and political change, overwhelmed by conflict, making various movements of forest exploitation to maintained forest management and production more and more complicated.

Forest legislation of ATO member countries aim to promote the balanced utilization of the forest domain and of wildlife and fishery in order to increase the input of the forest sector to the economic, social, cultural and scientific development of the country.

Deforestation

Tropical rainforests are distributed across West African countries. However, it is becoming clear that the area is experiencing a high rate of deforestation. The term deforestation refers to the complete obstruction of forest canopy cover for means of agriculture, plantations, cattle-ranching, and other non-forest fields. Other observed changes in these forests are forest disintegration (changing the spatial continuity and creating a mosaic of forest blocks and other land cover types), and selective logging of woody species for profitable purposes that affects the forest subfloor and the biodiversity.

Several conservation and development demographic settings indicate that maximum loss of rain forests has occurred in countries with higher population growth. Lack of dependable data and survey information in some countries has made the account of change in areas of unbroken forest and/or land under use and their relation to economic indicators difficult to ascertain. Hence, the amount and rate of deforestation in Africa are less known than other regions of tropics.

One reason for forest depletion is agriculture of cash crops. West African countries depend on cash crop exports. Products like gum, copal, rubber, cola nuts, and palm oil are an important source of steady income revenue for the West African countries. Land use change spoils entire habitats with the forests. Converting forests into timber is another cause of deforestation. Over decades, the primary forest product was commercial timber. Urbanized countries account for a great percentage of the world's wood consumption, that increased greatly between 1950 and 1980. Simultaneously, preservation measures were reinforced to protect European and American forests. Economic growth and growing environmental protection in industrialized European countries made request for tropical hardwood to become strong in West Africa. By 1985, 72% of West Africa's rainforests had been transformed into fallow lands and an additional 9% had been opened up by timber exploitation.

Tropical timber became a viable choice to European wood following World War II, as trade with East European countries stop and timber noticeably became sparse in western and southern Europe. Despite efforts to promote lesser known timber species use, the market continued to focus on part of the usable timber obtainable. West Africa was prone to selective harvesting practices; while conservationists blamed the timber industry and the farmers for felling trees, others believe rain forest destruction is connected to the problem of fuel wood. The contribution of fuel wood consumption to tree stock decline in Africa is believed to be significant. It is generally believed that firewood provides 75% of the energy used in sub-Sahara Africa. With the high demand, the consumption of wood for fuel exceeds the renewal of forest cover.

The rain forests which remain in West Africa now merely are how they were hardly 30 years ago. In Guinea, Liberia and the Ivory Coast, there is almost no primary forest cover left unscathed; in Ghana the situation is much worse, and nearly all the rain forest are cut down. Guinea-Bissau loses  of forest yearly, Senegal  of wooded savanna, and Nigeria 6,000,050,000 of both. Liberia exploits  of forests each year. Extrapolating from present rates of loss, botanist Peter Raven pictures that the majority of the world's moderate and smaller rain forests (such as in Africa) could be ruined in forty years. Tropical Africa is about 18% of the world total covering  of land in West and Central Africa. The region has been facing deforestation in various degrees of intensity throughout the recent decades. The actual rate of deforestation varies from one country to another and accurate data does not exist yet. Remaining tropical forest still cover major areas in Central Africa but are abridged by patches in West Africa.

The African Timber Organization member countries eventually recognized the cooperation between rural people and their forest environment. Customary law gives residents the right to use trees for firewood, fell trees for construction, and collect of forest products and rights for hunting or fishing and grazing or clearing of forests for maintenance agriculture. Other areas are called "protected forests", which means that uncontrolled clearings and unauthorized logging are forbidden. After World War II, commercial exploitation increased until no West African forestry department was able of making the law. By comparison with rain forests in other places of the world in 1973, Africa showed the greatest infringement though in total volume means, African timber production accounted just one third compared to that of Asia. The difference was due to the variety of trees in Africa forests and the demand for specific wood types in Europe.

Forestry regulations in east Africa were first applied by colonial governments. The Tropical Forestry Action Plan was conceived in 1987 by the World Resources Institute in cooperation with the Food and Agriculture Organization, the United Nations Development Program and the World Bank with hopes of halting tropical forest destruction. In its bid to stress forest conservation and development, the World Bank provided $111,103 million in building countries, especially in Africa, to help in developing long range forest conservation and management programs meant for ending deforestation.

Historical temperature and climate 
In early 2007, scientists created an entirely new proxy to determine annual mean air temperature on land—based on molecules from the cell membrane of soil inhabiting bacteria. Scientists from the NIOZ, Royal Netherlands Institute for Sea Research conducted a temperature record dating back to 25,000 years ago.
In concord with the German colleague of the University of Bremen, this detailed record shows the history of land temperatures based on the molecular fossils of soil bacteria. When applying this to the outflow core of the Congo River, the core contained eroded land material and microfossils from marine algae. That concluded that the land environment of tropical Africa was cooled more than the bordering Atlantic Ocean during the last ice-age. Since the Congo River drains a large part of tropical central Africa, the land derived material gives an integrated signal for a very large area. These findings further enlighten in natural disparities in climate and the possible costs of a warming earth on precipitation in central Africa.

Scientists discovered a way to measure sea temperature—based on organic molecules from algae growing off the surface layer of the Ocean. These organisms acclimatize the molecular composition of their cell membranes to ambient temperature to sustain regular physiological properties. If such molecules sink to the sea floor and are buried in sediments where oxygen does not go through, they can be preserved for thousands of years. The ratios between the different molecules from the algal cell membrane can approximate the past temperature of the sea surface. The new “proxy” used in this sediment core obtained both a continental and a sea surface temperature record. In comparison, both records shows that ocean surface and land temperatures behaved differently during the past 25,000 years. During the last ice age, African temperatures were 21 °C, about 4 °C lower than today, while the tropical Atlantic Ocean was only about 2.5 °C cooler. Lead author Johan Weijers and his colleagues arrived that the land-sea temperature difference has by far the largest influence on continental rainfall. The relation of air pressure to temperature strongly determines this factor. During the last ice age, the land climate in tropical Africa was drier than it is now, whereas it favors the growth of a lush rainforest.

See also 
 African Rainforest Conservancy (ARC)
 Afrotropical realm
 Global 200
 Plant Resources of Tropical Africa
 South Africa

References

Bibliography 
 Thieme, M.L., R. Abell, M.L.J. Stiassny, P. Skelton, B. Lehner, G.G. Teugels, E. Dinerstein, A.K. Toham, N. Burgess & D. Olson. 2005. Freshwater ecoregions of Africa and Madagascar: A conservation assessment. Washington D.C.,: WWF, Freshwater Ecoregions of Africa and Madagascar: A Conservation Assessment.

Further reading 
 Production Land use study

External links 

 Terrestrial ecoregions of the world
 African Invertebrates — A journal of Afrotropical biodiversity research
 Manual of Afrotropical Diptera
 CGIAR Research Program on integrated systems in the humid tropics

 
Biogeographic realms
Biota of Africa
.
.
Tropics
Biogeography
Natural history of Asia
Natural history of Africa
Regions of Africa